Silvia Tortosa (born 8 March 1947) is a Spanish actress. She has appeared in more than sixty films since 1966.

Selected filmography

References

External links 

1947 births
Living people
Spanish film actresses